Gbemi Olateru Olagbegi was a Nigerian broadcaster at The Beat 99.9 FM (she resigned in December 2021), entrepreneur and co-host of "Off-Air with Gbemi & Toolz" podcast. Gbemi is the grand-daughter of late Olowo of Owo Sir Olateru-Olagbegi II KBE. In 2008, Gbemi won the on-air personality of the year at the Future Awards Africa. In 2015, Gbemi founded Gbemisoke shoes. A shoe line created for women with difficulties in shopping for the right shoe size. At the fifth edition of the Arise Fashion Week, Lagos in 2018, Gbemi walked the runway for FIA Factory. In 2019, Gbemi became one of the faces from Megalectrics Ltd for Rémy Martin.

Early life
Gbemi was born on July 18, 1984, to Banke and Yemi Olateru-Olagbegi in St. Nicholas Hospital, Lagos. She attended Pampers Private School, Surulere, The Nigerian Navy Secondary School, Ojo between 1993 to 1997 then continued her secondary school education at Queens College, Yaba where she graduated in 2000. She obtained a B.A. in communications at Oakland University, Rochester and MSc. in Media and Communications from Pan-Atlantic University, Lagos.

Career

Broadcasting career 
After school, Gbemi served as a member of the youth corp at the Nigerian Television Authority, NTA 2 channel 5, Victoria Island before she moved to Cool FM Nigeria in 2005 where she hosted the Good Morning Nigeria show with the late Dan Foster for a year. In 2006, Gbemi hosted the Midday Oasis until 2009 when she left Cool Fm for The Beat 99.9 FM. Gbemi was the deputy program director at Beat FM from 2011 to 2016 and Program Director to the sister-company, Naija FM 102.7 from 2011 to 2017. She left radio in December 2021.

Entrepreneur career 
She is known to be a serial entrepreneur. In 2015, Gbemi founded her shoe line, Gbemisoke Shoes, an idea born out of her personal experience when shopping for shoes.

Acting career 
Gbemi's first film appearance was in 2017, in a web series titled Our Best Friend's Wedding. She played the role of Kemi in the romantic dramedy by The Naked Convos in collaboration with RedTv. It starred Oreka Godis, Adebola Olowu, Chris Attoh and lasted for two seasons. In 2020, she featured in another short film by The Naked Convos titled Heaven Baby.

TNC 
After Gbemi Olateru-Olagbegi left radio on the 24th of December, 2021. She was appointed as co-founder and co-executive producer of one of Africa's entertainment startups, TNC Africa. TNC Africa is a digital-focused TV and film production company.  it was launched in January 2021 by Olawale Adetula and Daniel Aideyan.

Wakanow Group 
On the 1st of February, 2023, Gbemi Olateru-Olagbegi announced her appointment as Group VP, Marketing at Wakanow Group. Gbemi supervises and develop marketing strategies for the brands within her portfolio, including Wakanow and Kalabash.

Personal life
Gbemi is a member of the royal Olagbegi Family of Owo, Ondo State. She has three brothers, Olatokunbo Olateru-Olagbegi, Bukunyi Olateru-Olagbegi and Adenola Olateru-Olagbegi and is happily married to Femisoro Ajayi

Awards
The future awards 2008 - "On Air Personality of the Year". She also won the 'Dynamix Awards' for Radio Presenter of the year in 2008. 
She also won the "Green Awards for Excellence" for the radio category that same year. In 2009, she won the "Exquisite Lady of the Year" award for "Best female radio presenter" and in 2010, she was nominated again for "The Future Awards". She won the City People Awards & The Nigerian Media Merit Awards in 2016 for On Air Personality of the Year.

Career Timeline
 2005-2006: Good Morning Nigeria Show, Cool FM Nigeria Co-host
 2006-2009: Midday Oasis, Cool FM Nigeria Host
 2009–Present: Drive Time Show, The Beat 99.9 FM, Lagos Host
 2011-2017: Program Director - Naija FM 102.7, Lagos
 2011-2016: Deputy Program Director - The Beat 99.9 FM Lagos

Notable Interviews
 Goodluck Ebele Jonathan
 Davido
 Wizkid
 Cardi B
 Kim Kardashian
 Future
 Jidenna
 Fabulous
 Angela Simmons
 Tim Westwood

Filmography

Awards and nominations

References

1984 births
Living people
People from Lagos
Nigerian radio presenters
Nigerian women radio presenters
Yoruba radio personalities
Oakland University alumni
Queen's College, Lagos alumni
Gbemi
Pan-Atlantic University alumni
Yoruba women
Residents of Lagos